Jamu is traditional medicine in Indonesia.

Jamu or JAMU may also refer to:
Jamu, Iran, a village in Kohgiluyeh and Boyer-Ahmad Province, Iran
Jamu Mare, rural municipality and village in Timiș County, Banat, Romania
Jamu Mic or Mali Žam, village in Vršac municipality, South Banat District, Vojvodina province, Serbia 
Janáček Academy of Music and Performing Arts, Czech Republic (abbreviation of Czech name)

See also
Jammu, region of India
Jammu (disambiguation)